Marcus Baugh (born December 9, 1994) is an American football tight end for the Michigan Panthers of the United States Football League (USFL). He played college football at Ohio State and was signed as an undrafted free agent by the Oakland Raiders in 2018. He has also been a member of the San Diego Fleet of the Alliance of American Football (AAF), and the Carolina Panthers, Washington Football Team and Pittsburgh Steelers of the National Football League (NFL).

Early years and college
Baugh attended John W. North High School in Riverside, California. A four-star recruit, Baugh committed to play football at Ohio State. At Ohio State, Baugh had 52 receptions, 573 receiving yards and seven touchdowns in his final two seasons.

Professional career

Oakland Raiders
Baugh signed as an undrafted free agent with the Oakland Raiders in 2018 but was waived prior to the regular season.

San Diego Fleet
Baugh then signed with the San Diego Fleet of the Alliance of American Football (AAF) in early 2019, where he caught 13 passes for 208 yards and two touchdowns before the league folded in April 2019.

Carolina Panthers
In April 2019, Baugh signed with the Carolina Panthers but was placed on injured reserve in the preseason before being waived in February 2020.

Washington Football Team
Baugh signed with the Washington Football Team in March 2020. He was waived on October 22, 2020, but re-signed to their practice squad two days later. He was promoted back to the active roster on December 9, 2020. Baugh was waived by Washington on May 10, 2021.

Pittsburgh Steelers
On July 30, 2021, Baugh signed with the Pittsburgh Steelers. He was waived on August 28, 2021.

Michigan Panthers
On March 10, 2022, Baugh was drafted by the Michigan Panthers of the United States Football League (USFL). He was transferred to the inactive roster on May 11 with a hand injury. He was moved back to the active roster on May 20.

References

1994 births
Living people
Players of American football from Riverside, California
African-American players of American football
American football tight ends
Ohio State Buckeyes football players
Oakland Raiders players
Carolina Panthers players
San Diego Fleet players
Washington Football Team players
Pittsburgh Steelers players
21st-century African-American sportspeople
Michigan Panthers (2022) players